Qəsil or Kasil’ may refer to:
Aşağı Qəsil, Azerbaijan
Orta Qəsil, Azerbaijan
Yuxarı Qəsil, Azerbaijan
Gasil, Alborz Province, Iran
Kasıl, Palu

Qasil may refer to:
Qasil, California in the United States (a former Native American village)